As of July 2017, the International Union for Conservation of Nature (IUCN) listed 1,000 critically endangered fish species, including 87 which are tagged as possibly extinct. Of all evaluated fish species, 3.0% are listed as critically endangered. 
The IUCN also lists four fish subspecies as critically endangered.

Of the subpopulations of fish evaluated by the IUCN, 20 species subpopulations and one subspecies subpopulation have been assessed as critically endangered.

Additionally 3191 fish species (21% of those evaluated) are listed as data deficient, meaning there is insufficient information for a full assessment of conservation status. As these species typically have small distributions and/or populations, they are intrinsically likely to be threatened, according to the IUCN. While the category data deficient indicates that no assessment of extinction risk has been made for the taxa, the IUCN notes that it may be appropriate to give them "the same degree of attention as threatened taxa, at least until their status can be assessed".

This is a complete list of critically endangered fish species and subspecies evaluated by the IUCN. Species considered possibly extinct by the IUCN are marked as such. Species and subspecies which have critically endangered subpopulations (or stocks) are indicated.

Cartilaginous fishes
Includes sharks, rays, skates, and shovelnose rays. The majority of the order Rhinopristiformes, which includes sawfish, guitarfish, wedgefish, and other shovelnose rays, is considered critically endangered, with 28 of its 64 evaluated species considered critically endangered by the IUCN.

Carchariniformes 

 Pondicherry shark (Carcharhinus hemiodon)
 Ganges shark (Glyphus gangeticus)
 Scalloped bonnethead (Sphyrna corona)
 Smalleye hammerhead (Sphyrna tudes)
 Scoophead (Sphyrna media)
 Great hammerhead (Sphyrna mokarran)
 Scalloped hammerhead (Sphyrna lewini)
 Lost shark (Carcharhinus obsoletus)
 Borneo shark (Carcharhinus borneensis)
 Tope (Galeorhinus galeus)
 Whitefin topeshark (Hemitriakis leucoperiptera)
 Daggernose shark (Isogomphon oxyrhynchus)
 Indian swellshark (Cephaloscyllium silasi)
 Reticulated swellshark (Cephaloscyllium fasciatum)
 Sarawak pygmy swellshark (Cephaloscyllium sarawakensis)
 Whitefin swellshark (Cephaloscyllium albipinnum)
 Smalltail shark (Carcharhinus porosus)
 Pacific smalltail shark (Carcharhinus cerdale)
 Oceanic whitetip shark (Carcharhinus longimanus)
 Spotted houndshark (Triakis maculata)
 Speckled smoothhound (Mustelus mento)
 Narrownose smoothhound (Mustelus schmitti)
 Striped smoothhound (Mustelus fasciatus)
 Humpback smoothhound (Mustelus whitneyi)

Lamniformes 

 Sand tiger shark (Carcharius taurus)

Orectolobiformes 

 Shorttail nurse shark (Pseudoginglymostoma brevicaudatum)

Squaliformes 

 Dwarf gulper shark (Centrophorus atromarginatus)

Squatiniformes 

 Angelshark (Squatina squatina)
 Smoothback angelshark (Squatina oculata)
 Sawback angelshark (Squatina aculeata)
 Hidden angelshark (Squatina occulta)
 Japanese angelshark (Squatina japonica)
 Indonesian angelshark (Squatina legnota)
 Argentine angelshark (Squatina argentina)
 Chilean angelshark (Squatina armata)

Rajiformes 

 Common blue skate
 Longnose skate
 Bignose fanskate
 Flapper skate
 Menni's skate
 Korean skate
 Maltese skate
 Spotback skate

Myliobatiformes 

 Wingfin stingray
 Smalltooth stingray
 Colares stingray
 Smooth stingray
 Pakistan whipray
 Shorttail whipray
 Thorny whipray
 Smalleye round ray
 Reticulate round ray
 Tentacled butterfly ray
 Starrynose cowtail ray
 Lusitanian cownose ray
 Java stingaree
 Common eagle ray
 Duckbill eagle ray
 Shortnose eagle ray

Rhinopristiformes 

 Largetooth sawfish (Pristis pristis)
 Smalltooth sawfish (Pristis pectinata)
 Green sawfish (Pristis zijsron)
 Giant guitarfish (Glaucostegus typus)
 Halavi guitarfish (Glaucostegus halavi)
 Bowmouth guitarfish (Rhina ancylostoma) 
 Smoothback guitarfish (Rhinobatus lionotus)
 Spineback guitarfish (Rhinobatos irvinei)
 Sharpnose guitarfish (Glaucostegus granulatus)
 Stripenose guitarfish (Acroteriobatus variegatus)
 Clubnose guitarfish (Glaucostegus thouin)
 Widenose guitarfish (Glaucostegus obtusus)
 Whitespotted guitarfish (Rhynchobatus djiddensis)
 Jimbaran guitarfish (Rhinobatos jimbaraensis)
 Brown guitarfish (Rhinobatos schlegeii)
 Blackchin guitarfish (Glaucostegus cemiculus)
 Bengal guitarfish (Rhinobatus annandalei)
 Brazilian guitarfish (Pseudobatus horkelii)
 Common guitarfish (Rhinobatos rhinobatos)
 Philippine guitarfish (Rhinobatos whitei)
 Broadnose wedgefish (Rhynchobatus springeri)
 Bottlenose wedgefish (Rhynchobatus australiae)
 Smoothnose wedgefish (Rhynchobatus laevis)
 African wedgefish (Rhynchobatus luebberti)
 Taiwanese wedgefish (Rhynchobatus immaculatus)
 Clown wedgefish (Rhynchobatus cooki)
 Whitespotted wedgefish (Rhinobatus albomaculatus)
 False shark ray (Rhynchorhina mauritaniensis)

Torpediniformes 

 Red Sea torpedo (Torpedo suessii)
 Argentine torpedo (Tetronarce puelcha)

Subpopulations

Ray-finned fishes
There are 431 species, four subspecies, four subpopulations of species, and one subpopulations of subspecies of ray-finned fish assessed as critically endangered.

Acipenseriformes
Acipenseriformes includes sturgeons and paddlefishes. There are 17 species and one subpopulation in the order Acipenseriformes assessed as critically endangered.

Sturgeons

Species

Subpopulations
White sturgeon (Acipenser transmontanus) (2 subpopulations)

Salmoniformes

Species

Subpopulations of species
Sockeye salmon (Oncorhynchus nerka) (4 subpopulations)
Subpopulations of subspecies
Aral sea trout (Salmo trutta aralensis) (1 subpopulation)

Silversides

Toothcarps

Species

Subspecies
Epiplatys fasciolatus josianae
Ejagham killi (Fundulopanchax gardneri lacustris)

Cypriniformes
Cypriniformes includes carps, minnows, loaches and relatives. There are 145 species, one subspecies, and one subpopulation in the order Cypriniformes assessed as critically endangered.

Hillstream loaches

True loaches

Cyprinids

Species

Subspecies
Rhodeus ocellatus smithii
Subpopulations
Common carp (Cyprinus carpio) (1 subpopulation)

Psilorhynchids
Psilorhynchus tenura

Suckers
June sucker (Chasmistes liorus)
Razorback sucker (Xyrauchen texanus)

Osmeriformes

Catfishes

Perciformes
There are 144 species, one subspecies, and one subpopulation in the order Perciformes assessed as critically endangered.

Cichlids

Species

Subspecies
Chromidotilapia guntheri loennbergii

Percids

Gobies

Other Perciformes

Species

Subpopulations
Atlantic wreckfish (Polyprion americanus) (1 subpopulation)

Characiformes

Other ray-finned fish species

Other fishes

See also 

 Lists of IUCN Red List critically endangered species
 List of least concern fishes
 List of near threatened fishes
 List of vulnerable fishes
 List of endangered fishes
 List of recently extinct fishes
 List of data deficient fishes
 Sustainable seafood advisory lists and certification

References 

 01
Fish
Critically endangered fish
Critically endangered fish
Critically endangered fish
Fish